Henri Charles Louis Boniface, Marquis de Castellane (23 September 1814, Paris – 16 October 1847, château de Rochecotte) was a French politician and nobleman.

Early life
He was the eldest son of marshal Boniface de Castellane.

Personal life
He married Pauline de Talleyrand-Périgord, bringing the château de Rochecotte into the Castellane family. Their two children were:

 Marie de Castellane (1840–1915), princess Radziwill by marriage, who published the "Chroniques de 1831 à 1862" by her grandmother Dorothea von Biron (Plon, 4 volumes, 1909)
 Antoine de Castellane (1844–1917), father to the dandy and politician Boniface de Castellane (1867–1932).

Henri died on 16 October 1847 at the château de Rochecotte.

References

1814 births
1847 deaths
Politicians from Paris
French marquesses
Henri
Members of the 6th Chamber of Deputies of the July Monarchy
Members of the 7th Chamber of Deputies of the July Monarchy
Henri